Betye Irene Saar (born July 30, 1926) is an African American artist known for her work in the medium of assemblage. Saar is a visual storyteller and an accomplished printmaker. Saar was a part of the Black Arts Movement in the 1970s, which engaged myths and stereotypes about race and femininity. Her work is considered highly political, as she challenged negative ideas about African Americans throughout her career; Saar is best known for her art work that critiques American racism toward Blacks.

Personal life 
Betye Saar was born Betye Irene Brown on July 30, 1926, to Jefferson Maze Brown and Beatrice Lillian Parson in Los Angeles, California. Both parents attended the University of California, Los Angeles, where they met. Saar spent her early years in Los Angeles. After her father's death in 1931, Saar and her mother, brother, and sister moved in with her paternal grandmother, Irene Hannah Maze, in the Watts neighborhood in Los Angeles. The family then moved to Pasadena, California, to live with Saar's maternal great-aunt Hatte Parson Keys and her husband Robert E. Keys.

Growing up, Saar collected various ephemera and regularly created and repaired objects. Her college education began with art classes at Pasadena City College and continued at the University of California, Los Angeles after she received a tuition award from an organization that raised funds to send minority students to universities. Saar received a B.A. in design in 1947. She went on to graduate studies at California State University, Long Beach, University of Southern California, California State University, Northridge, and American Film Institute. During her time in graduate school, she married Richard Saar and gave birth to three daughters: Tracye, Alison and Lezley Saar.

Artistic career

Early work 
Saar started her adult life as a social worker and then later pursued her passion in art. She began her graduate education in 1958, originally working towards a career in teaching design. However, a printmaking class she took as an elective changed the direction of her artistic interests. She described printmaking as her "segue from design into fine arts."

In Saar's early work she collected racist imagery and continued throughout her career. She was inspired to create assemblages by a 1967 exhibition by found object sculptor, Joseph Cornell. She was also greatly influenced by Simon Rodia's Watts Towers, which she witnessed being built in her childhood. Saar said that she was "fascinated by the materials that Simon Rodia used, the broken dishes, sea shells, rusty tools, even corn cobs—all pressed into cement to create spires. To me, they were magical."

In oral history interviews, Saar later recalled seeing extensive African, Oceanic and Egyptian art on a visit to the Field Museum in Chicago as being "an important step in my development as an artist ... They had rooms and rooms of it. I had never seen that much.” She found the robe of an African chief especially meaningful.

She began to create work that consisted of found objects arranged within boxes or windows, with items that drew from various cultures to reflect her own mixed ancestry: African American, Irish, and Native American.

Rejection of white feminism and reclaiming the black female body 

Saar was raised by her Aunt Hattie, who influenced her identity as a Black woman. Saar described her great-aunt as a woman with dignity and poise, which impacted her depiction of the Black female body. This impact is evident in a work Saar dedicated to her great-aunt titled Record For Hattie, 1972. Saar's rejection of white feminism initially pushed her artistic focus on the Black male but in the 1970s she shifted her focus to the Black female body. Record For Hattie is a mixed media assemblage made from an antique jewelry box. Inside the top of the jewelry box is a broken picture frame containing a faded picture of a woman, representing her Aunt Hattie. Surrounding the picture frame rose materials are sewn along with a red and white star and crescent moon pendent. In the bottom of the jewelry box there is a metal cross on the right side, a red leather wallet in the middle, on top is an image of child, and on the left there are sewing materials. During the 1970s Saar responded to the racism, fetishization, and eroticization of the Black female body by reclaiming the Black female body. Saar's work resisted the artistic style of primitivism, as well as the white feminist movement that refused to address issues of race. Saar's work is a result of the convergence of Black power, spirituality and mysticism, and feminism, as seen in Black Girl's Window, 1969. Black Girl's Window is an assemblage piece made from an old window, in which the painted silhouette of a girl presses her face and hands against the pane. Above her head are nine smaller window panes arranged three by three, which display various symbols and images, including moons and stars, a howling wolf, a sketched skeleton, an eagle with the word "love" across its chest, and a tintype woman.

In the 1960s, Saar began collecting images of Aunt Jemima, Uncle Tom, Little Black Sambo, and other stereotyped African American figures from folk culture and advertising of the Jim Crow era. She incorporated them into collages and assemblages, transforming them into statements of political and social protest. The Liberation of Aunt Jemima is one of her most notable works from this era. In this mixed-media assemblage, Saar utilized the stereotypical mammy figure of Aunt Jemima to subvert traditional notions of race and gender. "It's like they abolished slavery but they kept Black people in the kitchen as Mammy jars," Saar says of what drove her to make the piece. "I had this Aunt Jemima, and I wanted to put a rifle and a grenade under her skirts. I wanted to empower her. I wanted to make her a warrior. I wanted people to know that Black people wouldn't be enslaved by that."

Saar's assemblage is laid inside of a shoebox-sized frame, plastered with Aunt Jemima advertisements. A caricatured sculpture of Aunt Jemima presents a notepad with a photograph of a Mammy with a white baby depicted. The Aunt Jemima sculpture holds a broom and a rifle, subverting her happy servant and caregiver stereotype by way of a militant alter ego who demands her own agency and power. A large, clenched fist, echoing the Black power symbol, is collaged over and partially obscuring the Mammy photograph, recognizing the aggressive and radical means used by African American activists in the 1970s to fight for their rights. Aunt Jemima is liberated through transformation from a racist domestic caricature into an image of Black power.

Although Saar considers herself to be a feminist, she avoids referring to her artwork as such. Instead, Saar prefers to emphasize the elements of cross-culturalism and spirituality that are present in her pieces. During the early 1970s, Saar endured racism within the context of the white feminist arts movement. These experiences caused her to become interested in promoting a Black consciousness that was distinct from the Black power politics of the era. Saar's autobiographical representations of Black womanhood are not erotic and do not represent the body in an explicit manner; therefore, they exemplify a resistance to imaging the Black body. This resistance suggests her rejection of white feminism and her rejection of the "feminine aesthetic" that is determined by white feminists and grounded in female sexuality.

Saar was supported as an artist-in-residence in Adelaide, South Australia, by the Women's Art Movement there in the 1970s or 1980s.

Assemblage and installation 
Saar's lifelong habit of scouring flea markets and yard sales deepened her exposure to the many racial stereotypes and demeaning depictions of Blacks to be found among the artifacts of American commercial and consumer culture, such as advertisements, marketing materials, knickknacks, sheet music, and toys. Three years later, she produced a series of more than twenty pieces that, in her own words, "exploded the myth" of such imagery, beginning with her seminal portrait of Aunt Jemima. In the 1970s, Saar moved on to explore ritual and tribal objects from Africa as well as items from African American folk traditions. In boxed assemblages, she combined shamanistic tribal fetishes with images and objects intended to evoke the magical and the mystical. When her great-aunt died in 1974, Saar acquired family memorabilia and created a series of more personal and intimate assemblages that incorporated nostalgic mementos of her great-aunt's life. She arranged old photographs, letters, lockets, dried flowers, and handkerchiefs in shrine-like boxes to suggest memory, loss, and the passage of time. This became a body of work she referred to as her "nostalgic series."

In 1977, Saar created a piece entitled Spirit Catcher. It was inspired by and looks like a traditional craft item used in rituals, but was personally invented by her. She claims that although the object is not authentically sourced, it still has magical qualities. There is a mirror on the top of the artwork that could be interpreted as an evil eye against racism. Saar occasionally utilized organic materials in her work, such as bamboo, skulls, raffia, and rattan, and a few of these materials can be seen in Spirit Catcher. This assemblage piece caused many Los Angeles-based artists of color to see the straw and beads as a way to explore an organic and even mysterious sense of Blackness. Saar and this particular piece were also the subjects of a short television documentary entitled "Spirit Catcher—The Art of Betye Saar," which aired on television in 1978.

In the early 1980s, Saar taught in Los Angeles at UCLA and the Otis Art Institute. In her own work she approached a larger, room-sized scale, and created site-specific installations. These included altar-like shrines exploring the relationship between technology and spirituality, and incorporated her interests in mysticism and Voodoo. Through the pairing of computer chips with mystical amulets and charms, these monumental constructions suggested the need for an alliance of both systems of knowledge: the technical and the spiritual.

Saar continues to live and work in Los Angeles, working primarily in found object sculpture. She has been awarded honorary doctorate degrees by California College of Arts and Crafts, California Institute of the Arts, Massachusetts College of Art, Otis College of Art and Design, and San Francisco Art Institute.

As of 2016, she celebrated her work with a couple parties and a solo show of new work at Roberts and Tilton Gallery.

The Liberation of Aunt Jemima 
Betye Saar's 1972 artwork The Liberation of Aunt Jemima  was inspired by a knick knack she found of Aunt Jemima although it seems like a painting, it is a three dimensional mixed media assemblage 11 3/4" x 8" x 3/4". The journal Blacks in Higher Education states that "her painting offered a detailed history of the Black experience in America". Saar shows Aunt Jemima exaggerated in every way by stereotypes. She wears a large exaggerated colored dress, along with a bright checkered head piece. Her skin is depicted as really Black, her eyes are large bulging out of her head. Her lips are large and highlighted with red color. She draws out the stereotype of being Black. Holding a broom in one hand showing they were only good for cleaning. The woman also stands on cotton representing slavery. The Woman's Art Journal states: "African American artists as diverse as Betye Saar reclaim and explore their identity. ‘Not good enough’ and ‘But good enough to serve.’" While the piece shows the Aunt Jemima holding a cleaning tool in her right hand, it also shows her holding a rifle in her left. This allows Saar to establish a visual connection between Aunt Jemima and the concept of resistance. By doing so, Aunt Jemima is depicted as being a powerful figure who commands the attention and respect of the viewers. Angela Davis has said the work launched the Black women's movement.

In her 2016 article "Influences" for Frieze, Saar explains directly about some of her artistic choices in the piece: "I found a little Aunt Jemima mammy figure, a caricature of a Black slave, like those later used to advertise pancakes. She had a broom in one hand and, on the other side, I gave her a rifle. In front of her, I placed a little postcard, of a mammy with a mulatto child, which is another way Black women were exploited during slavery. I used the derogatory image to empower the Black woman by making her a revolutionary, like she was rebelling against her past enslavement."

In the book Parodise of Ownership  by Richard Schur states, "Saar deployed Aunt Jemima's image to promote cultural nationalism during the 1960s and 1970s[…] sought to correct the injustice done by over one hundred years of stereotyped advertising and depicts Aunt Jemima in an angry, defiant, and/ or rebellious poses."  She wanted to promote support for political independence and break stereotypes used to describe Black women. The artwork was originally inspired by the assassination of Dr. Martin Luther King Jr.

In "The Women's Art Journal Betye Saar: Extending the Frozen Monument", James Cristen Steward states: "Against the backdrop of pancake packaging is a grinning popped-eye 'Mammy" with a broom in one hand and a rifle in the other. In the foreground another vintage caricature  of a jaunty, almost flirtatious Mammy, one arm balancing a willing white child against her corset hourglass waste she simply allows the derogatory images to speak for themselves". The broom symbolizes the domesticity that Black women were forced to occupy jobs in serving, confining them to specific places. White people's perspective on Black women was that they were only good for serving others. She portrays through her art the two representations of Black women, how stereotypes portray them, defeminizing and desexualizing them and reality. Saar's intention for having the stereotype of the mammy holding a rifle to symbolize that Black women are strong and can endure anything, a representation of a warrior.  Saar has stated, that "the reasoning behind this decision is to empower Black women and not let the narrative of a white person determine how a Black women should view herself".

Film 
In 1971, Saar created a film entitled Colored Spade. Following the assassination of Dr. Martin Luther King Jr. in 1968, Saar began to work with the racist images of Black individuals that had become so popular in American culture. Saar decided to compile such images into a film that was based on the song from the musical Hair called "Colored Spade," which contains a list of derogatory terms for African Americans. The film depicts a montage of caricatured images from the late-nineteenth and early-twentieth century culture, such as sheet music, comics, and food containers. Many of these images are animated by camera movements, zooms, and rapid cutting. Eventually, the images of Black individuals are replaced by images of racist organizations, which all culminate into a photograph of a white policeman. Saar zooms in on this image until the focus is lost, and then zooms out to reveal prominent figures from the Civil Rights movement, such as Dr. King and Angela Davis. This recontextualization of racist culture allows the issue to serve as evidence of white prejudice as opposed to Black degeneracy.

Political activism 
In the late 1960s, her focus turned to the civil rights movement and issues of race. Black women artists such as Faith Ringgold, Betye Saar, Adrian Piper, Howardena Pindell, and Barbara Chase-Riboud explored the African American identities and actively rejected art world racism, while simultaneously being drawn to the cause of women's liberation.

Saar, in her artistic journey through various artistic and activist communities from Black nationalist to Black feminist and womanist, maintained a "mobile of identity" that permitted her to interact freely with each group. Saar met with other Black women artists at Suzanne Jackson's Gallery 32 in 1970. The resulting group show was titled Sapphire (You've Come a Long Way, Baby). This was likely the first contemporary African American women's exhibition in California, and included watercolorist Sue Irons, printmaker Yvonne Cole Meo, painter Suzanne Jackson, pop artist Eileen Abdulrashid, Gloria Bohanon, and Saar.

When asked about the politics behind her art in a 2015 interview with writer Shelley Leopold, Saar stated, "I don't know how politics can be avoided. If you happen to be a young Black male, your parents are terrified that you're going to be arrested—if they hang out with a friend, are they going to be considered a gang? That kind of fear is one you have to pay attention to. It's not comfortable living in the United States. I'm born in Los Angeles, with middle class parents and so I never really had to be in a situation that tense. My grandmother lived in Watts and it's still really poor down there. People just do the best they can."

Letter campaign
In the late 1990s, Saar was a recognizable and vocal critic of artist Kara Walker's work. Kara Walker created artworks that some scholars said exhibited "the psychological dimension of stereotypes and the obscenity of the American racial unconscious". Walker's controversial works included Gone, An Historical Romance of a Civil War as it Occurred Between the Dusky Thighs of One Young Negress and Her Heart (1994), and The End of Uncle Tom and Grand Allegorical Tableau of Eva in Heaven (1995). The shocking images, her supporters said, challenged racist and stereotypical images of African Americans by offering stark images of the degradation of African Americans. Other critics, such as Saar and Howardena Pindell, disagreed with Walker's approach and believed the artist was reinforcing racism and racist stereotypes of African American life. In an NPR Radio interview, Saar "felt the work of Kara Walker was sort of revolting and negative and a form of betrayal to the slaves, particularly women and children, and that it was basically for the amusement and the investment of the white art establishment". The difference in age between Saar and her contemporaries and Walker can explain the older critics’ reactions to Walker's work. When Walker received the John D. and Catherine T. MacArthur Foundation Genius Award in 1997, Saar wrote letters to people in the art industry, protesting the award and asking, "Are African Americans being betrayed under the guise of art?"

Solo exhibitions 

 1973 California State University, Los Angeles, California.
 1975 Whitney Museum of American Art, New York, New York.
 1976 Wadsworth Atheneum, Hartford, Connecticut and Monique Knowlton Gallery, New York, New York.
 1977 Baun-Silverman Gallery, Los Angeles, California and San Francisco Museum of Modern Art, San Francisco, California.
 1979 Baum-Silverman Gallery, Los Angeles, California.
 1980 Studio Museum in Harlem, New York, New York.
 1981 Baum-Silverman Gallery, Los Angeles, California and Monique Knowlton Gallery, New York, New York.
 1982 Quay Gallery, San Francisco, California.
 1983 Women's Art Movement, Adelaide, Australia and Canberra School of Art, Canberra Connecticut, Australia.
 1984 California, Los Angeles, California and Georgia State University Art Gallery, Atlanta, Georgia.
 1987 Pennsylvania Academy of the Fine Arts, Philadelphia, Pennsylvania and Massachusetts Institute of Technology, Cambridge, Massachusetts.
 1988 Taichung Museum of Art, Taichung, Taiwan.
 1989 City Gallery Wellington, Wellington, New Zealand and Art space, Auckland, New Zealand
 1990 Museum of Contemporary Art, Los Angeles, California.
 1991 Objects Gallery, Chicago, Illinois.
 1992 The Ritual Journey. Joseloff Gallery, University of Hartford, Connecticut.
 1993 Fresno Art Museum, Fresno, California.
 1994 Santa Monica Museum of Art, Santa Monica, California.
 1996 Des Moines Art Center, Des Moines, Iowa and The Palmer Museum of Art, Penn State College, Pennsylvania and de Saisset Museum, Santa Clara, California and Joslyn Art Museum, Omaha, Nebraska.
 1997 Tacoma Art Museum, Tacoma, Washington.
 1998 Michael Rosenfeld Gallery, New York, New York and Jan Baum Gallery, Los Angeles, California and California African American Museum, Los Angeles, California.
 1999 University of New Mexico Art Museum, University of New Mexico, Albuquerque, New Mexico and Anderson Ranch Art Center, Snowmass, Colorado and The Detroit Institute of Arts, Detroit, Michigan.
 2000 Savannah College of Art & Design, Savannah, Georgia and Michael Rosenfeld Gallery, New York City, New York.
 2002 Merrill Lynch & Co., Inc., Princeton, NJ
 2005 University of Michigan Museum of Art, Ann Arbor, Michigan
 2006 Crocker Art Museum, Sacramento, California
 2014 Roberts & Tilton, Culver City, California
 2016 Scottsdale Museum of Contemporary Art, Scottsdale, Arizona
 2016 Fondazione Prada, Milan Italy
 2016 Roberts & Tilton, Culver City, California
 2017 Craft and Folk Art Museum (now Craft Contemporary), Los Angeles
 2018 Roberts Projects, Culver City, California
 2019 New York Historical Society, New York, NY
 2019 Museum of Modern Art, New York, NY
 2019 LACMA, Los Angeles, CA
 2020 Morgan Library & Museum, New York, NY
 2021 Nasher Sculpture Center, Dallas, TX //www.nashersculpturecenter.org/art/exhibitions/exhibition/id/1802?betye-saar-call-and-response
 2022 Institute of Contemporary Art, Miami, FL

Awards and honors 

 1984 and 1974: National Endowment for the Arts Artist Fellowship
 1990: 22nd Annual Artist Award, The Studio Museum in Harlem, New York
 1990: J. Paul Getty Fund for the Visual Arts Fellowship
 1991: Honorary Doctorate Degree: California College of the Arts
 1991: John Simon Guggenheim Memorial Foundation
 1992: Honorary Doctorate Degrees: Otis College of Art and Design and San Francisco Art Institute
 1992: James Van Der Zee Award, Brandywine Workshop, Philadelphia, Pennsylvania
 1993: Distinguished Artist Award, Fresno Art Museum
 1995: Honorary Doctorate Degrees: California Institute of the Arts and Massachusetts College of Art
 1997: The Visual Artists Award, The Flintridge Foundation, Pasadena, California
 2014: Edward MacDowell Medal
 2020: Wolfgang-Hahn-Preis Köln

Notable works in public collections 
Aries Nymph (1966), University Museum of Contemporary Art, Amherst, Massachusetts
A Siege of Sirens (1966), Museum of Fine Arts, Boston and Museum of Modern Art, New York
Vision of El Cremo (1967), Palmer Museum of Art, State College, Pennsylvania
Black Girl's Window (1969), Museum of Modern Art, New York
Gris-Gris Box (1972), Museum of Contemporary Art, Los Angeles
The Liberation of Aunt Jemima (1972), Berkeley Art Museum and Pacific Film Archive, California
It's Only A Matter of Time (1974), Hirshhorn Museum and Sculpture Garden, Smithsonian Institution, Washington, DC
The Time Inbetween (1974), San Francisco Museum of Modern Art
Indigo Mercy (1975), Studio Museum in Harlem, New York
The Birds and The Beasts Were There (1976), Hirshhorn Museum and Sculpture Garden, Smithsonian Institution, Washington, DC
Dark Erotic Dream (1976), Hirshhorn Museum and Sculpture Garden, Smithsonian Institution, Washington, DC
Keep for Old Memoirs (1976), Museum of Modern Art, New York
Samadhi (1977), High Museum of Art, Atlanta
Twilight Awakening (1978), National Gallery of Art, Washington, DC
Window of Ancient Sirens (1979), Studio Museum in Harlem, New York
Dat Ol' Black Magic (1981), National Gallery of Art, Washington, DC
Ball of Fire (1985), Philadelphia Museum of Art
Cryptic Confessions, The Question (1988), Boca Raton Museum of Art, Florida
The Differences Between (1989), Museum of Fine Arts, Boston
House of Ancient Memory (1989), Walker Art Center, Minneapolis
La Luz (1989), Munson-Williams-Proctor Arts Institute, Utica, New York
Wishing for Winter (1989), Smithsonian Museum of American Art, Smithsonian Institution, Washington, DC
Ancestral Spirit Chair (1992), Smith College Museum of Art, Northampton, Massachusetts
Gris Gris Guardian (1990-1993), Los Angeles County Museum of Art
The Trickster (1994), National Gallery of Art, Washington, DC
Whitey's Way (1970-1996), Metropolitan Museum of Art, New York
Blow Top Blues: The Fire Next Time (1998), Minneapolis Institute of Art and National Gallery of Art, Washington, DC
I'll Bend But I Will Not Break (1998), Los Angeles County Museum of Art
The Long Memory (1998), Pennsylvania Academy of the Fine Arts, Philadelphia and Smith College Museum of Art, Northampton, Massachusetts
Maid-Rite (Mask Eyes) (1998), Pennsylvania Academy of the Fine Arts, Philadelphia
Mother and Children in Blue (1998), Whitney Museum of American Art, New York
Wot's Dat (1998) from the series Workers + Warriors: The Return of Aunt Jemima, Herbert F. Johnson Museum of Art, Ithaca, New York

Further reading 
 Paysour, Fleur. "Wonders of the House of Saar." International Review of African American Art vol. 20, no. 3 (2005), pp. 51–3
 Willette, Jeanne S. M. "Stitching Lives: Fabric in the Art of Betye Saar." Fiberarts vol. 23 (March/April 1997), pp. 44–81
 Van Proyen, M. "A Conversation with Betye and Alison Saar" [interview]. Artweek v. 22 (August 15, 1991) pp. 3+
 Etra, John. "Family Ties." ARTnews vol. 90 (May 1991), pp. 128–33.
 Saar, Betye, et al. 2005. Betye Saar: Extending the Frozen Moment. Ann Arbor; Berkeley: University of Michigan Museum of Art; University of California Press
 Saar, Betye [entry in] Women Artists of Color: A Biocritical Sourcebook to 20th Century Artists in the Americas. Phoebe Farris, ed. Westport, Connecticut: 1999. Pages 333–339. Entry includes biography, selected exhibitions, 41-item bibliography, and biographical essay. Jones, Kellie et al. Now dig this! : art & Black Los Angeles, 1960–1980. 2011 Los Angeles: Hammer Museum, 2011.
 Jones, Kellie. South of Pico: African American Artists in Los Angeles in the 1960s and 1970s. Durham: Duke University Press, 2017.

References

External links 

 
 Betye Saar at Roberts Projects, Los Angeles, CA

1926 births
Assemblage artists
American contemporary artists
African-American contemporary artists
African-American feminists
American feminists
University of California, Los Angeles alumni
California State University, Long Beach alumni
Living people
American women printmakers
20th-century American women artists
20th-century American printmakers
Activists from California
21st-century American women artists
Artists from Los Angeles
African-American printmakers
20th-century African-American women
20th-century African-American people
20th-century African-American artists
21st-century African-American women